Clayton Bourne (25 April 1904 – 31 December 1986) was a Canadian swimmer. He competed in the men's 100 metre freestyle event at the 1924 Summer Olympics.

References

External links
 

1904 births
1986 deaths
Canadian male swimmers
Olympic swimmers of Canada
Swimmers at the 1924 Summer Olympics
Sportspeople from British Columbia
People from the Regional District of Kitimat–Stikine
20th-century Canadian people